Ikuforiji Olaitan Abdulrahman, known professionally as Oxlade, is a Nigerian singer and songwriter signed to Troniq Music, Epic Records in France, and Fuenlabrada Records in the UK. He rose to prominence with the release of the song "Away", which appeared on Rolling Stones 50 best songs of 2020. Oxlade was named the first Pandora Africa's Next Artist in July 2022.

Early life and career
Ikuforiji Olaitan Abdulrahman was born on 22 April, 1997 in Surulere, a residential area of Lagos. After the passing of his mother at a tender age, he was raised by his father and grandmother. His father was a lecturer at Lagos State University, where he gained admission to study History and International Relations. He enrolled for two years before dropping off to pursue his musical career.

In 2018, he was approached by A&R executive Bizzle Osikoya, right after the release of "Mamiwota" by Blaqbonez, off the Bad Boy Blaq EP, released through 100 Crowns, an imprint of Chocolate City. After his meeting with Bizzle, he signed a management deal with The Plug. Thereafter he signed a publishing, licensing and distribution deal with The Plug Entertainment, and a record deal with Troniq Music. On 27 December 2018, Davido allowed Oxlade perform at City of David concert in Lagos, and he opened for Wizkid in London at Star Boy Fest in 2019.

On 13 April 2020, he released the music video for Away, directed by TG Omori for Troniq Music. On 15 April 2020, he tells, Tami Makinde of The Native, he was instructed by TG Omori, to sit on his lady's lap to personify the popular saying "behind every successful man is a woman". On 7 November 2020, Drake posted a screenshot on his Instagram story, listening to Away. Right after the Canadian rapper made the post, he gained 3 million streams within 24 hours. He achieved mainstream recognition with his hit track "Away", released as a single from his EP Oxygene, released through Troniq Music, and The Plug Entertainment, on 27 March 2020. "Away" appeared at number 23 on the Nigerian TurnTable Top 50 year-end chart of 2020. He released "DKT" independently on 3 September 2020 and its music video on 10 May 2021, which was shot and directed by Dammy Twitch.

In January 2021, his collaboration with Dolapo, and Ms Banks on their song "Interest", earned him his first entry on Capital XTRA Airplay Chart at number eleven on 18 February 2021, and also earned him his first career entry on the UK Afrobeats Singles Chart at number ten, and spent twelve consecutive weeks on the chart. On 15 January 2021, the music video for "Interest", was released and directed by Capone. In October 2021, he earned his second entry on the UK Afrobeats Singles Chart with his track "Ojuju", which is currently on chart for five consecutive weeks, since 3 October. It also peaked at number thirteen on Nigeria's TurnTable Top 50 weekly chart. On 3 September 2021, he released the official music video for "Ojuju", directed and shot by Ademola Falomo. He was featured on the single "Kolo" by Ice Prince, which spent eighteen consecutive weeks on chart, and peaked at number eight on TurnTable Top 50 weekly chart. On 11 March 2021, the music video for "Kolo", was released and directed by Director UAX.

He was featured on the song "Overdue" from the Coming 2 America soundtrack album Rhythms of Zamunda, curated by Sipho Dlamini, and released on 5 March 2021, through Def Jam Recordings Africa, and Def Jam Recordings. On 20 August 2021, Troniq Music, and Oxlade, released the four-tracks extended play Eclipse, produced solely by DJ Coublon, through Troniq Music, and Epic Records France. On 24 August 2021, Oxlade performed "Slow Down" by Skip Marley for The Grammy web series popularly known as Reimagined At Home. On 10 March 2022, Oxlade signed a new deal with Columbia Records UK. On 18 March 2022, he released "Want You", his first single in 2022, one month after the sex scander. The song was produced by TMXO, and mixed by Spax. The music video was released on 18 March 2022, and directed by Director UAX.

On 10 June 2022, he released "Ku Lo Sa", for ColorsxStudios. Following its release, a live-performing video was released on Colors YouTube channel, which has received over 1 million YouTube streams as of July 14, 2022. On 19 June 2022, it debuted at number 11 on the Official Afrobeats Chart Top 20 chart, and reached number 8 on 10 July 2022, exactly one month after its initial release. On 11 July 2022, it debuted at number 66 on TurnTable Nigeria Top 100 chart. On 13 July 2022, Oxlade was named the first Pandora Africa's Next Artist. During their discussion, he talked about the constant surge of emerging artists in Nigeria and making a name for himself in America, Afro pop, and his growth as one of the fast-rising talents out of Africa. Following this, he performed "Want You" for Pandora Africa's Next Radio.

On February 2023, Oxlade's KU LO SO received the Listener's Choice award at the Soundcity MVP Awards which were held at the Eko Convention Centre in Lagos.

Controversy
On 12 October 2020, Oxlade was injured during the EndSARS protest in Surulere, a commercial area in Lagos. Residents and fellow protesters reported the situation with the hashtag #EndSARS, with a video clip of Oxlade manager Ojah'B, who was seen being beaten as police violently shut down the protest.

On 8 February 2022, a sex tape of Oxlade's was leaked from Snapchat, and became a trending topic on Twitter. On 10 February 2022, the woman featured in the video publicly disclosed her intention to sue Oxlade for 20 million naira. On 12 February 2022, Oxlade apologized on Twitter to his fans and the woman in the video.

Artistry
His voice as described by Efe Ukpebor of Nigeria Entertainment Today, is "smooth", with a seamless blend of musical genres. He describes his sound as a bridge between the Alte (Afro-fusion/experimental music expressions) and the mainstream. His lyrics are a mixture of English, and Pidgin English, often exploring contemporary topics such as love.

Discography

EPs

Singles

As lead artist

As featured artist

Filmography

Awards and nominations

Notes

References 

Living people
1997 births
Nigerian musicians
Lagos State University people
Epic Records artists
Singers from Lagos
Nigerian rhythm and blues singers